Herochroma sinapiaria is a species of moth of the family Geometridae first described by Gustave Arthur Poujade in 1895. It is found in the Chinese provinces of Shaanxi, Hunan, Yunnan, Sichuan and Xizang.

References

External links
A study on the genus Herochroma Swinhoe in China, with descriptions of four new species (Lepidoptera: Geometridae: Geometrinae). Acta Entomologica Sinica

Moths described in 1895
Pseudoterpnini
Moths of Asia